Pál is an impact crater on Mars.  It lies south of Tyrrhenus Mons on Hesperia Planum, but close to the area dominated by the ejecta of the Hellas basin. The smaller Dowa crater is to the east.

It was named by the IAU in 2010 after George Pál, American-Hungarian film producer.

References 

Impact craters on Mars